Lepidosaphes gloverii is a species of armored scale insect in the family Diaspididae.

References

Further reading

 
 
 
 

Insects described in 1869
Lepidosaphidini